The list of shipwrecks in 2019 includes ships sunk, foundered, grounded, or otherwise lost during 2019.

January

2 January

3 January

6 January

7 January

8 January

11 January

13 January

15 January

17 January

21 January

29 January

30 January

31 January

February

4 February

7 February

8 February

11 February

15 February

16 February

23 February

24 February

March

1 March

2 March

3 March

5 March

7 March

9 March

12 March

13 March

14 March

15 March

18 March

19 March

20 March

21 March

23 March

April

8 April

15 April

22 April

30 April

May

7 May

9 May

10 May

12 May

18 May

25 May

26 May

29 May

31 May

June

4 June

8 June

9 June

13 June

15 June

25 June

28 June

July

3 July

5 July

9 July

18 July

26 July

31 July

August

1 August

2 August

3 August

4 August

7 August

16 August

22 August

25 August

31 August

September

1 September

2 September

6 September

8 September

12 September

25 September

26 September

28 September

October

1 October

6 October

7 October

12 October

18 October

24 October

27 October

28 October

30 October

31 October

November

4 November

9 November

10 November

16 November

20 November

22 November

23 November

24 November

29 November

30 November

December

3 December

5 December

9 December

10 December

11 December

12 December

15 December

16 December

18 December

22 December

23 December

25 December

28 December

31 December

References

Shipwrecks
2019